This is a list of animated short films produced by Pixar Animation Studios.

Beginning with Pixar's second film A Bug's Life, almost all subsequent Pixar feature films have been shown in theaters along with a Pixar-created original short film, known as a "short." Other Pixar shorts, released only on home media, were created to showcase Pixar's technology or cinematic capabilities, or on commission for clients.

Pixar began producing shorts in the 1980s. The first shorts were made while Pixar was still a computer hardware company, when John Lasseter was the only professional animator in the company's small animation department. Starting with Geri's Game, after Pixar had converted into an animation studio, all later shorts have been produced with a larger crew and budget.

In 1991, Pixar made four CGI shorts produced for the educational TV series Sesame Street. The shorts illustrate different weights and directions starring Luxo Jr. and Luxo — Light & Heavy, Surprise, Up and Down, and Front and Back.

During the development of Toy Story, Pixar set up a division to work on Pixar video games called Pixar's Interactive Products Group, specifically Toy Story entries in the Disney's Animated Storybook and Disney's Activity Center. Due to the intense resources required, the division was eventually folded and the staff were redistributed to start creating short films to accompany Pixar's theatrical releases.

Beginning with A Bug's Life, Pixar has created extra content for each of their films that are not part of the main story. For their early theatrical releases, this content was in the form of outtakes and appeared as part of the film's credits. For each of their films, this content was a short made exclusively for the DVD release of the film.

Starting with Toy Story 4, Pixar has discontinued theatrical shorts before the movie.

Shorts

Theatrical short films

SparkShorts series
SparkShorts is a series of animated short films produced by Pixar filmmakers and artists, similar to its sister series Short Circuit from Disney. It consists of longer independent shorts. Under the project, Pixar's employees are merely given six months and limited budgets to develop these animated short films.

Feature-related

Pixar Popcorn

Notes

Short series

Cars Toons

Mater's Tall Tales

Tales from Radiator Springs

Toy Story Toons

Forky Asks a Question

Dug Days

Cars on the Road

Compilations

Other work

Pixar made a series of clips featuring Luxo and Luxo Jr. for Sesame Street, which were Light & Heavy, Surprise,  Up and Down, and Front and Back. Pixar also produced numerous animation tests, commonly confused with theatrical shorts, including Beach Chair and Flags and Waves. They also produced several commercials after selling their software division to support themselves until Toy Story became successful. Pixar continues to produce commercials related to their films. Some of their other work includes:

Furthermore, in 1988, Apple's Advanced Technology Group produced "Pencil Test," a computer-animated short to showcase the Apple Macintosh II line. Although Pixar was not officially affiliated with this film, several members of the Pixar staff advised and worked on it, including directors John Lasseter, Andrew Stanton, and producer Galyn Susman. John Lasseter was credited as "Coach" in the credits of the film. The Pixar Co-op Program, a part of the Pixar University professional development program, allows their animators to use Pixar resources to produce independent films. The first CGI project accepted to the program was Borrowed Time (2016), directed by Pixar animators Andrew Coats and Lou Hamou-Lhadj; all previously accepted films were live-action.

See also
List of Pixar films

Notes

References

External links
 at Pixar

Shorts
Pixar